Brochiloricaria chauliodon is a species of armored catfish endemic to Argentina where it is found in the Rio de la Plata Basin.

References 
 

Loricariini
Freshwater fish of Argentina
Fish of South America
Endemic fauna of Argentina
Taxa named by Isaäc J. H. Isbrücker
Fish described in 1979